Anticollix is a genus of moths in the family Geometridae.

Species

 Anticollix lysimachiata
 Anticollix melanoparia
 Anticollix nigricata
 Anticollix obscura
 Anticollix sparsatus – dentated pug moth (Treitschke, 1828)

References
 Anticollix at Markku Savela's Lepidoptera and Some Other Life Forms

Melanthiini
Geometridae genera